Soundbombing II is the second installment in Rawkus Records' Soundbombing compilation series.

Track listing

Album chart positions

Singles chart positions

References

Hip hop compilation albums
Albums produced by Da Beatminerz
Albums produced by Hi-Tek
Albums produced by Diamond D
1999 compilation albums
Rawkus Records compilation albums
Sequel albums